Cadarius was a nobleman in the Kingdom of Hungary who served as Judge royal in 1146, during the reign of Géza II of Hungary. His name is mentioned by only one royal charter in 1146, where a certain "newcomer" (advena) noble Fulko donated his lands to the Abbey of Pannonhalma.

References

Sources
  Markó, László: A magyar állam főméltóságai Szent Istvántól napjainkig – Életrajzi Lexikon (The High Officers of the Hungarian State from Saint Stephen to the Present Days – A Biographical Encyclopedia) (2nd edition); Helikon Kiadó Kft., 2006, Budapest; .
  Zsoldos, Attila (2011). Magyarország világi archontológiája, 1000–1301 ("Secular Archontology of Hungary, 1000–1301"). História, MTA Történettudományi Intézete. Budapest. 

Judges royal
12th-century Hungarian people